Pata is a village on the island of Upolu in Samoa. It is in the political district of A'ana.

The population is 487.

References

Populated places in A'ana